Uijin was a Japanese alternative idol girl group that formed in 2016. They debuted on July 5, 2017, with Stay Hungry, Stay Foooolish. The group disbanded on January 5, 2020.

Members
Ary (ありぃ)
Hitochibi (ひとちび)
Yayoi (やよい)
Rin (りん)

Discography

Studio albums

Singles

References

Japanese girl groups
Japanese idol groups
Japanese pop music groups
Musical groups from Tokyo
Musical groups established in 2016
2016 establishments in Japan
Musical groups disestablished in 2020
2020 disestablishments in Japan